Derek Hudson Burney, OC (born 1939) for a time served as Canada's ambassador to the US, and was political strategist for both the government of Brian Mulroney and of Stephen Harper. He was for a time an executive or director in private industry. He was Chancellor of Lakehead University 2013-2017.

Early life 
Burney was born in Fort William, Ontario (now known as Thunder Bay) to George William Burney (1886–1951) of Westville, Nova Scotia, and Annie Mary MacKay (1906–1995), who was born in Durban, South Africa but grew up on the Isle of Lewis in the Scottish Hebrides.

Burney attended Fort William Collegiate Institute. He then went on to study at Queen's University, where he received his B.A. degree in 1962, followed by his M.A. degree in 1964.

Career

In the civil service
Upon graduation, Burney entered the federal public service and the Canadian diplomatic corps, subsequently serving in Japan and, as Ambassador, in Korea. From 1987 to 1989 he served as Chief of Staff to Prime Minister Brian Mulroney.

After leaving the post of Chief of Staff in 1989, Burney became Canada's Ambassador to the United States. He would serve in this position until 1993.

In private industry
Burney was then hired by Bell Canada and worked as Chairman and CEO of Bell Canada International Inc. from 1993 to 1999.  He then moved to CAE Inc., serving as President and CEO until 2004. The boards of directors on which Burney has sat or now sits include CanWest Global Communications (which went bankrupt), Quebecor World Inc., Shell Canada and TransCanada Corp.  He is currently the president of the board of New Brunswick Power and serves on the advisory board of Paradigm Capital.

On January 24, 2006, newly elected Prime Minister Stephen Harper announced that Burney would play a key role in the transfer of power from Paul Martin's Liberals to Harper's Conservatives.

As an academic
Burney taught at the Norman Paterson School of International Affairs at Carleton University.

On January 24, 2013, Lakehead University announced that Burney would become its 8th Chancellor.  Burney served as chancellor of Lakehead University until 2017.

Later life
In later life, Burney began contributing his opinions in the national media. On 6 May 2020, he asked for a "full post-mortem" and specifically asked about the state of readiness of Canada before the pandemic began. He wanted to know whether the Chinese government concealed evidence of the outbreak in late 2019, and suggested an investigation of whether the WHO was complicit. He worried about the insolvency that waits next to the subsidy, and said there were "more people riding in the wagon than pulling it". On 14 May, he castigated the Trudeau government over its conduct of relations with China: "The litany of apologies and obsequiousness by Canada is one that only a lickspittle would salute."

Family

Burney's son Derek Burney Jr. was the president of Corel Corporation for several years and later worked for Microsoft before retiring in 2021. Another son, Ian Burney, is a Canadian diplomat, serving as Ambassador to Japan from 2016 to 2021.

Honours 
Burney was named an Officer of the Order of Canada in 1993, and has been conferred honorary Doctor of Laws degrees from Lakehead University, Queen's University, Carleton University, and Wilfrid Laurier University.

Burney has a street named after him in his home town of Thunder Bay. Derek Burney Drive is home to the Confederation College Aviation Centre of Excellence, Ornge hangar and Levaero Aviation.

Notes

References
Burney, Derek. Getting It Done: A Memoir. Montreal: McGill-Queen's University Press, 2005. .

External links

1939 births
Living people
Ambassadors of Canada to Japan
Ambassadors of Canada to South Korea
Ambassadors of Canada to the United States
Businesspeople from Ontario
Canadian chairpersons of corporations
Canadian chief executives
Academic staff of Carleton University
Chiefs of staff of the Canadian Prime Minister's Office
Directors of Shell plc
Officers of the Order of Canada
NB Power
Politicians from Thunder Bay
People of Bell Canada
Queen's University at Kingston alumni
Quebecor people
Canadian university and college chief executives